Return of the Fabric Four is the sixth album by the London-based acid jazz band Corduroy. It was released on Acid Jazz Records in 2018.

Reception

Record Collector awarded the album with 4 stars and in its review, Lois Wilson called the record "another groovy (imaginary) soundtrack to a 1960s spy film, part-nostalgia, part-originality, wholly fun". In their top 200 albums of 2018, Louder Than War voted Return of the Fabric Four at No. 83. In an online video premiere of the single "Saturday Club" for Louder Than War, Ioan Humphreys states: "Returning after a nearly-two-decade hiatus, the band certainly seem like they are having a right laugh in this renaissance of their career".

Track listing

Personnel 
 Ben Addison – vocals, drums, sleeve design and illustration
 Scott Addison – vocals, keyboards
 Simon Nelson-Smith – guitars
 Richard Searle – bass guitar

References 

2018 albums
Corduroy (band) albums
Acid Jazz Records albums